Defense strategy may refer to:

 Military strategy
 Defense (legal)
 Defense strategy (computing)